The Queen's Gambit is a 1983 American novel by Walter Tevis, exploring the life of fictional female chess prodigy Beth Harmon. A bildungsroman, or coming-of-age story, it covers themes of adoption, feminism, chess, drug addiction and alcoholism. The book was adapted for the 2020 Netflix miniseries of the same name.

Epigraph
The novel's epigraph is "The Long-Legged Fly" by W. B. Yeats. This poem highlights one of the novel's main concerns: the inner workings of genius in a woman. Tevis discussed this concern in a 1983 interview, the year before his death.

Development
In a New York Times interview published at the time of his book's release in 1983, Tevis stated the story is "a tribute to brainy women."
There has been speculation as to the inspiration for the Beth Harmon character, but Tevis emphatically denied that she was based on anyone in the chess community, male or female.

In 2007, actor Heath Ledger was working on what would have been his feature directing debut, an adaptation of the Walter Tevis novel "The Queen's Gambit," with British writer/producer Allan Scott.

The leading role of a young female chess prodigy had been offered to Oscar nominee Elliot Page. Ledger, himself a highly rated chess player, was due to play a supporting role as well, until his untimely death.

Bruce Pandolfini, a US chess master, consulted on the chess positions prior to the book's publication, and was the one who suggested the book's final title after the chess opening called "Queen's Gambit". Thirty-eight years later, he also returned to consult on the 2020 Netflix adaptation.

Plot
At the age of 8, Beth Harmon is orphaned when her mother dies in a car accident. She is sent to Methuen, an orphanage where the children are fed tranquilizers to keep them compliant. 

While there Beth observes the janitor, Mr. Shaibel, playing chess by himself. While he is initially reluctant to teach a girl, Beth eventually persuades him to play with her. Within a few months Mr. Shaibel confesses he has taught her all he knows and introduces her to a local high school teacher who runs the chess club. 

Shortly after Beth beats a group of high school students at chess, she learns that the state is banning the use of tranquilizers on children. During an attempt to hoard the remaining tranquilizers for herself she accidentally overdoses. As part of her punishment for being caught she is forbidden from playing chess and interacting with Mr. Shaibel. She is befriended by Jolene, an athletic 13 year old black girl, who awkwardly attempts to initiate a sexual relationship.

5 years later at the age of 13, Beth is adopted by the Wheatleys. Mr. Wheatley abandons his wife shortly after Beth is adopted. Beth immediately tries to play chess again. After stealing a chess magazine she learns that a local high school is holding a chess tournament and secretly writes to Mr. Shaibel asking him to lend her the funds to enter the tournament. Despite being an unranked player and not having had access to a chess set in five years, Beth not only wins the tournament but defeats the Kentucky state champion Harry Beltik. Unable to cash her winnings herself she reveals that she has won to Mrs. Wheatley. In desperate financial straits Mrs. Wheatley begins arranging for Beth to play more tournaments focusing on the ones with the highest prizes and collecting a 10% agent's fee. 

Beth attracts attention as a prodigy but meets the U.S. champion, Benny Watts, a former prodigy himself, and is beaten by him resulting in her being crowned U.S. co-champion. For several years she feels that despite her talent she is floundering as she is aging. She also continues to use both drugs and alcohol recreationally, stealing tranquilizers from Mrs. Wheatley and discovering that bingeing alcohol relaxes her anxiety. At the age of 18 she attends a competition in Mexico where she meets and is defeated by the Russian Vasily Borgov. Returning to her hotel room she discovers that Mrs. Wheatley has died, leaving her orphaned once again. 

Back in the U.S., Beth reunites with Harry Beltik who, while he admires her for being an intuitive player, insists she study chess more seriously. They begin both a professional and personal relationship but after he teaches her all he knows he abruptly leaves to focus on his studies. 

Beth attends the U.S. championships and manages to defeat Benny Watts. Finally the solo U.S. champion, she now gets invitations to compete internationally. Benny offers to coach her, so she moves to New York to study under him, and they also start a sexual relationship. Beth quickly outstrips Benny and goes to Paris confident she is capable of beating Borgov. But although she plays her best and makes no obvious errors, Borgov defeats her. Beth returns to Kentucky where she begins binge drinking.

After attending a tournament to defend her Kentucky state champion title and losing badly in the first game, Beth realizes she is an alcoholic. She reaches out to her old friend from Methuen, Jolene, now a phys ed teacher who is getting a master's in political science. Jolene helps Beth get clean, and Beth triumphs at her next tournament.

Beth prepares to go to the Moscow international tournament, desperate for revenge against Borgov. Benny offers to go as her second, i.e. as a player who will strategize with Beth and help her prepare. While there is not much money available through the U.S. Chess Federation, a Christian organization offers to pay for everything as long as Beth is prepared to promote anti-communist propaganda. Declining, Beth ends up returning their money and is left without Benny. She continues to Moscow alone.

In Moscow, Beth successfully defeats her opponents though she fears her final game against Borgov. She also comes to realize the Soviets help each other strategize for games while she is mostly alone. That evening, she finds it difficult to analyze the game but is saved by Benny, who calls her from New York and offers her his analysis. Once the game resumes, Borgov offers Beth a draw. She declines, going on to win the game. Beth makes plans to beat Borgov in the next two years to become world champion. At the embassy party celebrating her win, she feels uncomfortable and leaves early, going to play chess in the park against a group of local men who play for love of the game.

Literary significance and reception

The novel is a thriller, a sports or game novel, and a bildungsroman.

It is also highly praised for the technical accuracy of its depictions of chess:

Tevis based the chess scenes on his own experience as a "class C" player and on his long study of the game. He elaborates on this in the Author's Note for the novel:

Some criticisms from Edward Winter:

Screen adaptation

Prior to the 2020 Netflix miniseries, there were several unsuccessful attempts to adapt the book. In 1983, The New York Times journalist Jesse Kornbluth acquired the screenplay rights but the project was called off when Tevis died in 1984. In 1992, Scottish screenwriter Allan Scott purchased the rights from Tevis' widow, and wrote a script for an art house film. At different points directors Michael Apted and Bernardo Bertolucci were attached, but financing fell through.  In 2007, Scott was working with Heath Ledger on what would have been Ledger's directorial debut, where Ledger wanted actor Elliot Page to star as Beth Harmon. Ledger died in January 2008. Scott co-created and co-executive produced the 2020 Netflix series.

In March 2019, Netflix ordered a limited seven-episode series based on the novel, also titled The Queen's Gambit. Anya Taylor-Joy plays the lead role of the series, while Scott Frank serves as writer, director, and executive producer. It was released on October 23, 2020, to widespread attention and critical acclaim.

Differences from the novel
 In the novel, Beth is at home when her mother dies in a pile-up, and is informed by "a woman with a clipboard". There is no indication that she committed suicide, and little back story is given for either of her parents. Her father died a year previously and she has few memories of him; it is implied that he was an alcoholic. In the series, her mother is given a back story as a brilliant but troubled mathematician and frequently appears in flashbacks, while her estranged father is still alive.
 Jolene's sexual assault of Beth at the orphanage is not included in the series.
 In the novel, Beth leaves in the middle of the tournament to visit the Moscow park where men play chess, where she is recognized. She later ducks out early from a function at the American embassy to re-visit the park and play chess with them. In the series, she dramatically leaves the car on the way to the airport to visit the park for the first time, apparently unwilling to accept an invitation to appear at the White House.
 Townes appears only twice in the novel, once as an opponent in her first tournament, and once as a reporter interviewing her. It is only hinted that he is gay, with a reference to not having told her "the full story" about himself in Las Vegas.
 The character of Cleo does not appear in the novel. An attractive young woman named Jenny Baynes visits her at Benny's apartment along with chess players Levertov and Wexler, but takes no further part in the plot. In the series, Cleo's leading her on a drunken binge during a major tournament is an important plot point.

Stage adaptation 
On March 8, 2021, it was announced that the stage rights to the novel had been acquired by the entertainment company Level Forward.

Publication history
 1983, US, Random House
 2003, US, Vintage

References

1983 American novels
American bildungsromans
American novels adapted into television shows
American sports novels
American thriller novels
Feminist novels
Novels about alcoholism
Novels about chess
Novels by Walter Tevis
Psychological thriller novels
Random House books
Novels set in Kentucky